Gales Creek may refer to:

Gales Creek (North Carolina), a stream in the U.S. state of North Carolina
Gales Creek, North Carolina, a community named for the North Carolina stream
 Gales Creek (Oregon), the tributary of the Tualatin River 
Gales Creek, Oregon, a community in the U.S. state of Oregon